Laura Niquay (born 1982) is an Atikamekw singer-songwriter from Canada, whose album Waska Matisiwin was a longlisted nominee for the 2021 Polaris Music Prize.

Originally from Wemotaci, Quebec, Niquay participated in the recording of her uncle Arthur Petiquay's 2005 album Awacic. She released her own debut album, Waratanak, in 2015, and followed up with Waska Matisiwin in 2021. Waska Matisiwin won the Félix Award for Indigenous Language Album of the Year, and Niquay won the award for Indigenous Artist of the Year, at the 44th Félix Awards in 2022.

References

1982 births
21st-century Canadian women singers
21st-century First Nations people
Canadian women singer-songwriters
First Nations musicians
First Nations women
Singers from Quebec
Atikamekw people
Living people
Félix Award winners